Mattie is an extinct town in Roane County, West Virginia.

The town was named after Mattie Hunt, the child of an early postmaster.

References 

Ghost towns in West Virginia
Landforms of Roane County, West Virginia